Same as It Ever Was is the second album by American hip hop group House of Pain. It was released in 1994 and peaked at number 12 on the Top R&B/Hip-Hop Albums and Billboard 200. To record the album, the group had to work around Everlast's house arrest for a gun charge. The clean version of the second song from the album, "I'm a Swing It", was featured in the 2001 skateboarding video game Tony Hawk's Pro Skater 3.

Reception

Same as It Ever Was did not sell as well as their previous album had and reached gold status by Recording Industry Association of America. 

AllMusic gave it four out five stars. Matt Carlson of The Michigan Daily found the album quite good and noted "the music is laid back with some heavy driving forces underlying and strengthening it". Andrew Love of The Ocala Star-Banner gave it four stars saying "this is a band that has definitely progressed over the course of one album". J.D. Constantine of The Baltimore Sun did not like album and found it monotonous and unimaginative. Roger Catlin of the Hartford Courant said that while finding the continuity monotonous it's "hard and compelling" as well as a "strong outing". Music critic Robert Christgau gave the album an A- and described it as "the hardest hip hop of the year."

Track listing

Personnel

Eric Francis Schrody – vocals (tracks 1–2, 4–8, 10–15), mixing (tracks 12, 14)
Daniel O’Connor – vocals (tracks 2, 4, 10, 14–15), art direction
Leor Dimant – vocals (tracks 4, 15), production (tracks 2–4, 9, 11–15), mixing (tracks 3, 9, 12, 14, 15)
Lawrence Muggerud – executive production, production (tracks 1, 5–6, 8, 10-11), mixing (tracks 1–2, 4–6, 8, 10-11, 13, 15)
Joseph Kirkland – vocals, production and mixing (track 7)
Nick Vidal – production (track 1)
Eric Vidal – production (track 1)
Tom Coyne – mastering
Jason Roberts – engineering
Erwin Gorostiza – art direction
Butch Belair – photography
Ron Jaramillo – design
Kenton Parker – logo design

Charts

Certifications

References

1994 albums
House of Pain albums
Tommy Boy Records albums
Albums produced by DJ Muggs
Albums produced by DJ Lethal
Albums produced by Diamond D

Singles: On Point, Who's The Man